Gunnar Nygaard (surname often spelled "Nygård"; 12 October 1903 – 25 September 2002) was a Danish phycologist, and a leading authority on the ecology and taxonomy of Danish phytoplankton. Nygaard completed his Masters at University of Copenhagen, initially working at the Freshwater Biological Laboratory in Hillerød as a research stipendiary.  From 1933 until his retirement in 1972 he was employed as a lecturer in the Danish grammar school system.  Thereafter, he was provided an office at the Freshwater Biological Laboratory to facilitate his work. In recognition of his scientific contributions, the University of Copenhagen awarded him the degree dr. scient. honoris causa.

Publications

 
 
 
 
 
 Nygaard G. (1945)  Dansk planteplankton. Gyldendal, Copenhagen. 52 pp.
 
 
 
 
 
 
 Nygaard G. (1956) Phytoplankton. In: Berg K. & Pedersen LC. (eds.): Studies on the humic acid Lake Gribso. Folia Limnologica Scandinavica 8: 144 .
 
 
 
 
 
 Nygaard G. (1976)  Tavlerne fra "Dansk Planteplankton". Gyldendal, Copenhagen. 26 pp.

References

1903 births
2002 deaths
20th-century Danish botanists
Danish limnologists